An annular solar eclipse occurred on September 23, 1987. A solar eclipse occurs when the Moon passes between Earth and the Sun, thereby totally or partly obscuring the image of the Sun for a viewer on Earth. An annular solar eclipse occurs when the Moon's apparent diameter is smaller than the Sun's, blocking most of the Sun's light and causing the Sun to look like an annulus (ring). An annular eclipse appears as a partial eclipse over a region of the Earth thousands of kilometres wide. Annularity was visible in the Soviet Union (today's Kazakhstan), China (including Shanghai), southwestern Mongolia, Okinawa Islands of Japan except Kume Island and the southwestern tip of Kerama Islands, the Federal States of Micronesia, Papua New Guinea, Solomon Islands, Rotuma Islands of Fiji, Wallis Islands and West Samoa (the name changed to Samoa later). Occurring only 5 days after apogee (Apogee on September 18, 1987), the Moon's apparent diameter was relatively small.

Observation 
Five radio observation stations were present in China at the time of the eclipse, two of which were within the annularity, in Ürümqi and Shanghai respectively. A partial solar eclipse was observed from the other three, including one in Nanjing where the eclipse was close to annularity, and the rest two in Beijing and Kunming. The Department of Mathematics and Physics of the Chinese Academy of Sciences and the Chinese Astronomical Society held a meeting in Kunming in December 1986, deciding that on-site observation would be conducted at each station, among which the Shanghai Astronomical Observatory was considered to have the best location with a larger magnitude of the eclipse, longer duration and larger solar zenith angle. The Shanghai Astronomical Observatory conducted observations with seven different wave bands using a 25-metre radio telescope. The Yunnan Astronomical Observatory located in Kunming also conducted a multi-band joint observation of the partial solar eclipse.

The Chinese Research Institute of Radio Wave Propagation conducted observations with a high-frequency skywave radar located in Xinxiang on the southern limit of annularity. Uneven structure and motion were observed in the ionosphere, the highest operating frequency was found changed during the eclipse, and large-scale fluctuations continued after the eclipse.

Related eclipses

Eclipses of 1987 
 A hybrid solar eclipse on March 29.
 A penumbral lunar eclipse on April 14.
 An annular solar eclipse on September 23.
 A penumbral lunar eclipse on October 7.

Solar eclipses of 1986–1989

Saros 134

Metonic series

Notes

References

1987 9 23
1987 in science
1987 9 23
September 1987 events